
Gmina Siemyśl is a rural gmina (administrative district) in Kołobrzeg County, West Pomeranian Voivodeship, in north-western Poland.

Villages 
Gmina Siemyśl contains the villages and settlements of Białokury, Byszewo, Charzyno, Grabowo, Izdebno, Kędrzyno, Mącznik, Morowo, Niemierze, Nieżyn, Paprocie, Siemyśl, Świecie Kołobrzeskie, Trzynik, Unieradz, Wątłe Błota, Wędzice and Wszemierzyce.

Neighbouring gminas 
Gmina Siemyśl is bordered by the gminas of Brojce, Gościno, Kołobrzeg, Rymań and Trzebiatów.

References 
Polish official population figures 2006

Siemysl
Kołobrzeg County